The 2017–18 Wyoming Cowboys basketball team represented the University of Wyoming during the 2017–18 NCAA Division I men's basketball season. They were led by Allen Edwards in his second year as head coach at Wyoming. The Cowboys played their home games at the Arena-Auditorium in Laramie, Wyoming as members of the Mountain West Conference. They finished the season 20–13, 10–8 in Mountain West play to finish in sixth place. They defeated San Jose State in the first round of the Mountain West tournament before losing in the quarterfinals to New Mexico. Despite having 20 wins, they did not participate in a postseason tournament.

Previous season
The Cowboys finished the 2016–17 season 23–15, 8–10 in Mountain West play to finish in seventh place. They lost in the first round of the Mountain West tournament to Air Force. They were invited to the College Basketball Invitational (CBI) where they defeated Eastern Washington, UMKC, and Utah Valley to advance to the best-of-three championship series against Coastal Carolina. They defeated Coastal Carolina two-games-to-one to win the CBI championship. The Cowboys were the second consecutive Mountain West team to win the CBI after Nevada did so in 2016.

Offseason

Departures

2017 recruiting class

Preseason 
In a vote by conference media at the Mountain West media day, the Cowboys were picked to finish in seventh place in the Mountain West.

Roster

Statistics

Schedule and results

|-
!colspan=9 style=| Exhibition

|-
!colspan=9 style=| Non-conference regular season

|-
!colspan=9 style=| Mountain West regular season

|-
!colspan=9 style=| Mountain West tournament

Source

References

Wyoming Cowboys basketball seasons
Wyoming
Wyoming Cowboys bask
Wyoming Cowboys bask